Laxman Nayak or Laxman Naik (22 November 1899 – 29 March 1943) was a tribal
civil rights activist of South Odisha in eastern India. He belonged to Bhumia tribe of Odisha.

Nayak, an Odia folk-hero of Koraput of southernmost part of Odisha and a cult-figure among its tribals, was born in Tentuliguma village of the Koraput district and his father Padlam Nayak was a tribal chief and 'Mustadaar' under 'Jeypore Samasthanam' in the then Madras Presidency.

The local administration worked as a subsidiary of the British Government. The tribals under their administration were treated badly by revenue officials, forest guides and police constables, and were subjected to torture. Nayak organised the rebels successfully against exploitation by the officials of Jeypore Samasthanam. This brought him recognition as a potential tribal leader and the National Congress admitted Nayak into its fold. During the course of his training in Naupuri training centre for Congress workers, Nayak had the opportunity to meet and interact with several Zonal and State level leaders which enabled him to broaden his horizons. His training inculcated in him a spirit for Nationalism and indoctrinated him with the Gandhian principles of truth, nonviolence and peaceful non-cooperation with the British Government. He carried a charkha, with the message of adult education and abstinence from alcohol to every tribal household of his area and brought about a total change in the rural scenario. He became the leader of mission in the Congress campaign in the Koraput Sub-division during the first ever election in 1936.

Responding to the call of Mahatma Gandhi, Nayak led a procession on 21 August 1942 and demonstrated peacefully in front of Mathili Police Station. The police however fired at the demonstrators indiscriminately, which killed forty and injured more than two hundred people. The administration framed Nayak in a case of murder of a friend and the death sentence was pronounced on him on 13 November 1942. He was hanged on 29 March 1943 in Berhampur Jail.

References

1899 births
1943 deaths
Indian civil rights activists
People from British India
Indian tax resisters
Nonviolence advocates
People from Koraput district
Activists from Odisha
Gandhians